is a Japanese politician of the Liberal Democratic Party (LDP), a member of the House of Representatives in the Diet (national legislature). A native of Gifu, Gifu and graduate of Keio University, he was elected to the House for the first time in 2005. His father is former foreign minister Kabun Muto, and his grandfather is former member of the House of Representatives Kaichi Muto. He served as state minister of economy, trade and industry.

References

 

1955 births
Living people
People from Gifu
Keio University alumni
Koizumi Children
Members of the House of Representatives (Japan)
Liberal Democratic Party (Japan) politicians